Anna Alexeyevna Pogorilaya (born 10 April 1998) is a Russian figure skater. She is the 2016 World bronze medalist, a three-time European medalist (silver in 2017; bronze in 2015 and 2016), and the 2016 Russian national bronze medalist. She won gold at three Grand Prix events – the 2013 Cup of China, 2016 Rostelecom Cup, and 2016 NHK Trophy. Earlier in her career, she won bronze at the 2013 World Junior Championships and at the 2012–13 Junior Grand Prix Final.

Personal life 
Anna Alexeyevna Pogorilaya was born 10 April 1998 in Moscow, Russia. Her parents are from Kharkiv, Ukraine. She has a brother who is three years older. In 2016, she enrolled at the Moscow Institute of Physical Culture and Sports. In May 2018, she became engaged to Russian ice dancer Andrey Nevskiy, whom she met in 2015. They were married in July 2018.

Their daughter, Eva Andreyevna Nevskaya, was born on December 22, 2020.

Anna enjoys baking for her family in her free time.

Career

Early years 
Pogorilaya began skating at age four. Anna Tsareva became her coach around 2004.

Pogorilaya missed the 2009–2010 season due to Osgood–Schlatter affecting both of her legs, as well as a concussion. She placed 15th at the Russian Junior Championships in 2011 and 13th in 2012.

2012–2013 season: World Junior bronze medal 
In the 2012–2013 season, Pogorilaya made her ISU Junior Grand Prix debut. After taking bronze in Croatia, her first event, she then won gold at the JGP event in Germany. She qualified for the JGP Final in Sochi, where she won the bronze medal. At the Russian Championships, Pogorilaya placed fifth in her senior debut and sixth on the junior level. She took the bronze medal at the 2013 World Junior Championships in Milan, with teammates Elena Radionova and Yulia Lipnitskaya taking the gold and silver medals respectively.

2013–2014 season: Senior international debut 
Making her senior Grand Prix debut, Pogorilaya placed third in the short program and first in the free skate at the 2013 Cup of China. She edged out teammate Adelina Sotnikova and Italian Carolina Kostner for the gold medal. After winning bronze at the 2013 Trophee Eric Bompard, behind Sotnikova, she qualified for her first senior Grand Prix Final. In early December 2013, Pogorilaya said she was receiving more ice time and training twice as much as before. In Fukuoka, Japan, she placed sixth in the short program, fifth in the free skate, and sixth overall.

Following an eighth-place result at the 2014 Russian Championships, she was not assigned to the 2014 European Championships but was later named in the Russian team to the 2014 World Championships. At Worlds in Saitama, Japan, Pogorilaya placed sixth in the short program and third in the free skate, scoring personal bests in both segments. She won a small bronze medal for the free skate and finished fourth overall, behind Carolina Kostner.

2014–2015 season: First European medal 

Pogorilaya started her season at the 2014 Japan Open. She placed third with a score of 122.52 points in her free skate, helping Team Europe win the gold medal. Competing at her first Grand Prix event of the season, the 2014 Skate Canada, she placed first in both programs and won the gold medal with a total of 191.81 points. She took the silver medal behind Rika Hongo at the 2014 Rostelecom Cup and qualified for her second GP Final. She finished fourth at the 2014–15 Grand Prix Final in Barcelona after placing fourth in both segments. She then finished fourth at the 2015 Russian Championships, having ranked fourth in both segments.

Pogorilaya was selected to compete at the 2015 European Championships and won the bronze medal after placing third in both segments. She was also named in Russia's team for the 2015 World Championships in Shanghai, China. Before the event, she had been off the ice for a month after spraining her ankle and partially tearing her ligament during practice. Despite not having fully recovered from her injury, she chose to compete anyway. In the short program she had a hard fall on her triple loop and hit her face, placing 9th. In the free program, she singled a triple Lutz and fell twice, on another triple Lutz and on a double Axel-triple toe loop combination. She placed 13th in the free skate and 13th overall.

2015–2016 season: World bronze medal 

Starting her season on the ISU Challenger Series (CS), Pogorilaya took silver at the 2015 Ondrej Nepela Trophy after placing 9th in the short program and first in the free skate. She won the 2015 CS Mordovian Ornament with personal bests in all segments. Competing on the Grand Prix series, Pogorilaya finished 4th at the 2015 Cup of China and 9th at the 2015 NHK Trophy, she had a series of multiple falls in her short and free programs in both of her Grand Prix events. At the end of December, she won the bronze medal at the 2016 Russian Championships in Yekaterinburg as well as Russia's third spot at Europeans, having placed fourth in the short and third in the free.

In late January 2016, Pogorilaya repeated as the bronze medalist at the European Championships, which were held in Bratislava, Slovakia. At the 2016 World Championships in Boston, she placed second in the short program and fourth in the free skate, winning the bronze medal behind Russia's Evgenia Medvedeva and USA's Ashley Wagner.

2016–2017 season: First Grand Prix Final medal 
Pogorilaya won both of her Grand Prix events, the 2016 Rostelecom Cup and 2016 NHK Trophy. In December, she obtained the bronze medal in Marseille, France, at her third Grand Prix Final. Later that month, she finished 4th behind Maria Sotskova at the 2017 Russian Championships. She injured her knee in practice at the event before the free skate.

At the 2017 World Championships, Pogorilaya placed fourth in the short program but her 15th-place free skate, in which she fell three times, dropped her to 13th overall. She did not participate in the 2017 World Team Trophy.

2017–2018 season: Olympic season 
Due to an injury, Pogorilaya did not participate in the Russian test skates in Sochi during 9–10 September 2017. On 15 October 2017, she performed a new Spanish-themed short program during the second stage of the Russian Cup series held in Yoshkar-Ola; she finished behind Stanislava Konstantinova and Polina Tsurskaya. She withdrew from the next segment due to back discomfort.

In October, Pogorilaya competed at the 2017 Skate Canada International, placing second in the short program, 10th in the free skate, and 9th overall. She withdrew from her next Grand Prix event, the 2017 Skate America. Due to her back problems, she withdrew from the Russian Championships, saying that she was unable to train and that her season was over. After half a year off the ice and undergoing rehab to strengthen her muscles, she resumed skating, coached by Tsareva at a new rink.

Programs

Competitive highlights 

GP: Grand Prix; CS: Challenger Series; JGP: Junior Grand Prix

Detailed results 
Small medals for short and free programs awarded only at ISU Championships. At team events, medals awarded for team results only.

References

External links 

 
 

Russian female single skaters
1998 births
Living people
World Figure Skating Championships medalists
European Figure Skating Championships medalists
World Junior Figure Skating Championships medalists
Figure skaters from Moscow
Russian people of Ukrainian descent